Jericho Creek (Towssisink, Bakers Creek, Knowles Creek) is a tributary of the Delaware River, rising in Wrightstown Township, Bucks County, Pennsylvania, passing into Upper Makefield township where it meets its confluence with the Delaware.

History
Named for the nearby mountain of the same name, Jericho Creek formed part of the boundary of William Penn's original purchase of land on 15 July 1682 with the Lenape. Later it became the southern boundary of the Walking Purchase (19-20 September 1737). It was first named Bakers Creek for Henry Baker, Justice of the Peace, who may have been landowner and settler before 1682. The Indian Purchase of 1682 was limited to extend up the Delaware River from the mouth of the Neshaminy Creek "as far as a man can walk in a day and a half". It was said that this was done by William Penn himself, some of his friends and some indian chiefs. This was a leisurely walk with breaks, unlike the Walking Purchase of 1737 by Penn's sons. The creek was marked Knowles Creek on a number of maps of the 19th century.

Statistics
Jericho Creek was entered into the Geographic Names Information System database of the U.S. Geological Survey as identification number 1178049 on 2 August 1979, and is listed in the Pennsylvania Gazatteer of Streams as identification number 02975.

Course

Municipalities
Bucks County
Upper Makefield Township
Wrightstown Township

Crossings and Bridges

See also
List of rivers of Pennsylvania
List of rivers of the United States
List of Delaware River tributaries

References

Rivers of Bucks County, Pennsylvania
Rivers of Pennsylvania
Tributaries of the Delaware River